The Canton of Lanouaille is a former canton of the Dordogne département, in France. It was disbanded following the French canton reorganisation which came into effect in March 2015. It had 5,419 inhabitants (2012).

The lowest point of the canton is in Nanthiat at 135 m, the highest point is in Saint-Cyr-les-Champagnes at 435 m, the average elevation is 375 m. The most populated commune was Payzac with 1,026 inhabitants (2012).

Communes
The canton comprised the following communes:

Angoisse
Dussac
Lanouaille
Nanthiat
Payzac
Saint-Cyr-les-Champagnes
Saint-Sulpice-d'Excideuil
Sarlande 
Sarrazac
Savignac-Lédrier

Population history

See also 
 Cantons of the Dordogne department

References

 
Former cantons of Dordogne
2015 disestablishments in France
States and territories disestablished in 2015